Malvidin glucoside-ethyl-catechin is a flavanol-anthocyanin adduct. Flavanol-anthocyanin adducts are formed during wine ageing through reactions between anthocyanins and tannins present in grape, with yeast metabolites such as acetaldehyde. Acetaldehyde-induced reactions yield ethyl-linked species such as malvidin glucoside-ethyl-catechin.

This compound has a better color stability at pH 5.5 than malvidin-3O-glucoside. When the pH was increased from 2.2 to 5.5, the solution of the pigment became progressively more violet (λmax = 560 nm at pH 5.5), whereas similar solutions of the anthocyanin were almost colorless at pH 4.0.

Other types of aldehyde, such as isovaleraldehyde, benzaldehyde, propionaldehyde, isobutyraldehyde, formaldehyde or 2-methylbutyraldehyde, show the same reactivity in model solutions.

References

See also 
 Phenolic content in wine
 Wine color

Flavanols
Anthocyanins